Anderson Brothers Department Store is a registered historic building in Portsmouth, Ohio, listed in the National Register on 2001-02-02.

Historic uses 
Specialty Store

See also 
 Sears, Roebuck and Company

References 

Commercial buildings on the National Register of Historic Places in Ohio
Department stores on the National Register of Historic Places
Buildings and structures in Scioto County, Ohio
National Register of Historic Places in Scioto County, Ohio
Portsmouth, Ohio